Harrison Foster Phillips (born January 25, 1996), nicknamed "Horrible Harry", is an American football defensive end for the Minnesota Vikings of the National Football League (NFL). He played college football at Stanford.

Early years
Phillips attended Millard West High School in Omaha, Nebraska, where he played high school football. As a senior, he was the Nebraska Gatorade Football Player of the Year. He committed to Stanford University to play college football. In his high school career he had over 175 tackles, 35 sacks, and 75 TFL.

College career
Phillips played at Stanford from 2014 to 2017. He played in only one game as a sophomore in 2015 after tearing his ACL, and redshirted. In 2017, he led all FBS linemen with 103 tackles and earned All-Pac-12 First-team and Pac-12 All-Academic First-team honors.  He was also invited to play in the 2018 Senior Bowl.  Having graduated with a double major in Sociology and Science, Technology and Society, and a minor in Education in December 2017, Phillips decided to forgo his last year of eligibility and enter the 2018 NFL Draft.

Professional career

Buffalo Bills
On November 20, 2017, it was announced that Phillips had accepted his invitation to play in the Senior Bowl. On January 4, 2018, Phillips officially announced his decision to forgo his remaining year of eligibility and enter the 2018 NFL Draft. He was eligible to return as a fifth-year senior after missing the majority of his sophomore season due to an ankle injury he sustained in the season-opener. Phillips practiced well throughout preparations for the game and impressed scouts and analysts. On January 27, 2018, Phillips played in the 2018 Reese's Senior Bowl and was part of Denver Broncos' head coach Vance Joseph's North team that lost 45–16 to the South. He attended the NFL Scouting Combine in Indianapolis and performed all of the combine drills. Phillips finished first among any player in the bench press with 42 repetitions.

On March 27, 2018, Phillips participated at Stanford's pro day, but opted to stand on his combine numbers and only performed positional drills. At the conclusion of the pre-draft process, Phillips was projected to be a second round pick by NFL draft experts and scouts. He was ranked as the fourth best defensive tackle by Scouts Inc., was ranked the fifth best defensive tackle by DraftScout.com and NFL analyst Mike Mayock, and was ranked the sixth best defensive tackle by Sports Illustrated.

The Buffalo Bills selected Phillips in the third round (96th overall) of the 2018 NFL Draft. Phillips was the tenth defensive tackle drafted in 2018.

The Bills previously acquired the pick used to select Phillips along with Jordan Matthews in a trade with the Philadelphia Eagles.

On May 30, 2018, the Buffalo Bills signed Phillips to a four-year, $3.34 million contract that includes a signing bonus of $775,040. Phillips played a reserve role as a 1-tech tackle during his rookie season, alternating snaps with Star Lotulelei, Kyle Williams, and Jordan Phillips.

In his second year, Phillips recorded his first career sack against the New York Giants, taking down Eli Manning during a 28–14 Bills win. In Week 3, Phillips suffered a torn ACL and was ruled out for the season. He was placed on injured reserve on September 24, 2019.

Minnesota Vikings
On March 16, 2022, Phillips signed a three-year, $19.5 million contract with the Minnesota Vikings.

References

External links
Stanford Cardinal bio
Minnesota Vikings bio

1996 births
Living people
Sportspeople from Omaha, Nebraska
Players of American football from Nebraska
American football defensive tackles
Stanford Cardinal football players
Buffalo Bills players
Minnesota Vikings players
Ed Block Courage Award recipients